Isabel Maria de Alcântara, 1st and only Duchess of Goiás (3 May 1824 – 3 November 1898), was a Brazilian noble, the recognized daughter, born out of wedlock, of Emperor Pedro I of Brazil and Domitila de Castro, Marchioness of Santos, having been baptized on 31 May 1824.

She was legitimized, or recognized as a daughter of the Emperor, on 24 May 1826, by a decree who granted her the noble title of Duchess of Goiás and the right to be treated as "Her Highness, The Duchess of Goiás", treatment that would be unexpected and even irregular by Iberian monarchical traditions. Thanks to this, an order was sent to the headquarters of the Armed Forces of Brazil to salute the girl. She was thus, in practice, treated as a Brazilian princess (although these honors did not confer on her any place in the line of succession) and was considered in the First Reign of the Empire of Brazil a kind of protector of the province of Goiás.

Life

Birth and baptism
Isabel Maria was born in the city of Rio de Janeiro on 3 May 1824 and was registered as the daughter of unknown parents who would have been abandoned at the home of Colonel João de Castro (in fact, her maternal grandfather). In this condition, she was baptized twenty-eight days later, on 31 May, in the church of São Francisco Xavier do Engenho Velho, having as her godparents the parents of the Marchioness of Santos. Just before her two-year birthday, Emperor Pedro I publicly acknowledged his paternity (being the only one among his illegitimate offspring who was officially legitimized by him) and demanded that the alteration of the child's baptism seat to prove it.

Recognition by the Emperor
By a decree dated 24 May 1826, Emperor Pedro I of Brazil granted Isabel Maria the title of "Duchess of Goiás", the style of Highness and the right to use the honorific "Dona" (Lady), being the first person to hold the ducal rank in the newly Empire of Brazil. The imperial decree caused a furor in the Brazilian court and the event was celebrated in a party with grand gala pomp, celebrated in the Palace of Caminho Novo, the imposing residence that the Emperor built for his mistress the Marchioness of Santos on the outskirts of the Palace of São Cristóvão.

On 6 June 1826 and before the entire court, Isabel Maria was officially introduced to the Empress consort Maria Leopoldina of Austria. From then on, the Duchess of Goiás began to attend the palace daily to be educated along with her paternal half-sisters, the legitimate daughters of the imperial couple.

Following the death of Empress Maria Leopoldina in December 1826, Isabel Maria was taken to live permanently with her father at the Palace of São Cristóvão in August 1827. In 1829 Emperor Pedro I remarried and definitively broke up his relationship with the Marchioness of Santos, who was sent back to the city of São Paulo. The new Empress consort, Amélie of Leuchtenberg, had already made it clear that she would not allow that the illegitimate daughter of her husband would remain in the Palace of São Cristóvão and even before her arrival in Brazil, Isabel Maria had to be transferred to the Palace of Praia Grande, the official imperial summer residence, in the city of Niterói, located in the state of Rio de Janeiro.

Studies in Europe
Emperor Pedro I decided to send his legitimized daughter to be educated in Europe; on 25 November 1829, 5-years-old Isabel Maria embarked to France, taking a letter from secretary Francisco Gomes to the Viscount of Pedra Branca with the recommendation that her academical instruction should be "the best possible to make a nun, with the least possible expense, without however lacking the decency due to a daughter His Imperial Majesty, since she is a bastard". The voyage had numerous mishaps: a storm damaged the sails of the ship, its occupants were affected by an outbreak of fever and the little Duchess of Goiás began to complain of chest pain. In view of this situation, Paulo Martins de Almeida, responsible for the girl, ordered the commander of the ship to change the course to the city of Plymouth, where they landed on 8 February 1830. The cortege settled in London, while the Viscounts of Itabaiana and of Resende sought in the city of Paris one school suitable for the education of Isabel Maria.

Isabel Maria was finally taken to the city of Paris in France, and went on to study in the Ecole du Sacre-Coeur (now Musée Rodin), a boarding school where the daughters of the French Catholic aristocracy were educated. In Brazil, Emperor Pedro I received monthly medical reports and information on his daughter's development. The nuns responsible for the school reported that the Duchess of Goiás was extremely docile and, with the exception of the piano, had been doing well in all subjects. However, they also reported that it was given to mood swings when forced to study.

On 7 April 1831, Emperor Pedro I abdicated the throne of Brazil and left for Europe with his wife Amélia de Leuchtenberg and his eldest legitimate daughter Queen Maria II of Portugal. Shortly after a few months as a guest of King Louis Philippe I, the former Emperor and now Duke of Bragança acquired a home and Isabel Maria began to spend the weekends with her family. This time, Amélie of Leuchtenberg accepted her and ended up adopting her as a daughter. On January 25, 1832, the Duke of Bragança went to Portugal to retake the throne usurped by his younger brother Miguel, leaving Isabel Maria in the care of his wife and mother-in-law, Princess Augusta of Bavaria, Dowager Duchess of Leuchtenberg. Soon after the constitutional forces conquered Lisbon, the Duke of Bragança sent his brother-in-law, the Marquis of Loulé, to Paris to bring his wife and daughter Queen Maria II for Portuguese territory. The Duchess of Goiás, on that occasion, returned to the boarding school.

The Duke of Bragança died on 24 September 1834 and the task of raise Isabel Maria was assumed by his widow and her mother; in his will, the Duke gave his daughter a share of his estate. The Duchess of Goiás had been separated from the Marchioness of Santos at such a young age that she had no recollection of her biological mother and therefore she had always considered Amélie of Leuchtenberg and Dowager Duchess Augusta of Leuchtenberg as her natural mother and grandmother. In 1839, under the tutelage of the Marquis of Resende, Isabel Maria went to Munich and joined the Royal Institute of Young Women to complete her studies. In 1841, Amélie of Leuchtenberg sent news of her progress to her stepson, Emperor Pedro II: "Everyone is very happy with Isabel Maria at the institute, and my mother wrote that she grows and becomes more beautiful every day".

Marriage
At that time, Amélie of Leuchtenberg started looking for a suitable husband for her stepdaughter. Although she received a considerable inheritance from her father, Isabel Maria's dowry was provided by her siblings: Emperor Pedro II of Brazil, Queen Maria II of Portugal and by her own stepmother, who personally took care of her wedding trousseau. 

In 1842, the Duchess of Bragança informed the Emperor of Brazil that she had arranged for the Duchess of Goiás to marry Ernst Joseph Johann Fischler von Treuberg, 2nd Count of Treuberg and Baron of Holzen, son of Franz Xavier Nicolau Fischler von Treuberg (1775-1835) and his wife Princess Maria Kreszentia of Hohenzollern-Sigmaringen (1766-1844), youngest daughter of Karl Friedrich, Prince of Hohenzollern-Sigmaringen. Thirteen years older than the Brazilian Duchess, the Count was a wealthy landowner and related to the Prussian royal family on his mother's side. In November of that year, Amélie of Leuchtenberg asked Pedro II of Brazil to grant the Imperial Order of the Rose to Isabel Maria's future husband.

The wedding ceremony took place at the Palais Leuchtenberg in Munich on 17 April 1843. Due to her marriage to a foreigner, Isabel Maria lost her Brazilian title and honors. The couple had four children:

Marie Amélie Fischler von Treuberg (6 February 1844 – 30 March 1919).
Ferdinand Fischler von Treuberg (24 January 1845 – 3 July 1897), 3rd Count of Treuberg and Baron of Holzen; married Rosine Antonie Therese, Edle von Poschinger. Had issue.
Augusta Maria Fischler von Treuberg (8 October 1846 – 16 August 1909), married Maximilian, Baron Tänzl von Tratzberg.
Franz Xavier Fischler von Treuberg (2 July 1855 – 1 February 1933), married firstly Karoline von Wendt and secondly to his first wife's sister, Ludovika Manuela Maria von Wendt. Had issue in both marriages.

Relationship with the Duchess of Bragança
In 1848 and shortly after marrying with Maria Isabel de Alcântara (full-sister of the Duchess of Goiás), Pedro Caldeira Brant, Count of Iguaçu, tried to contact his sister-in-law in Bavaria. Isabel Maria, who had no recollection of her maternal family, was shocked when she received from the Count, as proof of her biological ancestry, the letters exchanged between Emperor Pedro I of Brazil and the Marchioness of Santos in which the lovers mentioned their daughter. The story, which had been hidden from the Duchess of Góias by the express wish of the late former Emperor and Duke of Bragança, ended up initially shaking the family relationship that Isabel Maria had with her stepmother Amélie of Leuchtenberg, whom she considered her mother.

Widowhood and later years. Death
The 2nd Count of Treuberg died on 14 May 1867, just six months before the death of his mother-in-law, the Marchioness of Santos. Isabel Maria de Alcântara (who remained in Europe and never returned to her homeland), died at Murnau am Staffelsee in the Kingdom of Bavaria, on 3 November 1898, exactly 31 years after her mother's death.

Titles
24 May 1826 – 17 April 1843: Her Highness The Duchess of Goiás
17 April 1843 – 3 November 1898: The Countess of Treuberg, Baroness of Holzen

Ancestry

Notes

References

Bibliography 
 
 
 
 
 
 

1824 births
1898 deaths
Brazilian nobility
Illegitimate children of Portuguese monarchs
Brazilian people of Austrian descent
Brazilian people of Portuguese descent
19th-century Brazilian women
People from Garmisch-Partenkirchen (district)
Daughters of emperors
Daughters of kings